Eupsilia morrisoni, or Morrison's sallow, is a species of cutworm or dart moth in the family Noctuidae. It is found in North America.

The MONA or Hodges number for Eupsilia morrisoni is 9936.

References

Further reading

 
 
 

Eupsilia
Articles created by Qbugbot
Moths described in 1874